Closset is a surname. Notable people with the surname include:

Marc Closset (born 1974), Belgian table tennis player
Marie Closset (1873–1952), Belgian poet
Roger Closset (1933–2020), French fencer

See also
Cosset (disambiguation)